Pierre-Gilles Lakafia (born 13 March 1987 in Tours, Indre-et-Loire, France) is a French rugby union player. He plays at Wing for Castres. He is the brother of Biarritz Olympique Number 8, Rafaël Lakafia and the son of former French javelin champion Jean-Paul Lakafia, and his mother was a discus thrower. His father is originally from Wallis and Futuna. He was a member of the French sevens team playing at the 2011 Hong Kong Sevens.

References

External links
 
 
 
 
 
 

1987 births
Living people
French rugby union players
H
Rugby union wings
Rugby union players from Wallis and Futuna
French people of Wallis and Futuna descent
Sportspeople from Tours, France
Rugby sevens players at the 2016 Summer Olympics
Olympic rugby sevens players of France
France international rugby sevens players
FC Grenoble players
Castres Olympique players
SC Albi players
French people of New Caledonian descent